MHP Communications is a public relations and public affairs firm, formed in 2010 from the merger of Mandate Communications, Hogarth PR and Penrose. It is owned by the Engine Group.

On launch the firm was one of the ten largest PR firms in the UK. MHP is a member of the  Association of Professional Political Consultants.

Clients
Their clients include AMEX, Kimberly-Clark, NHS Blood and Transplant, Clarks, Mothercare, AstraZeneca, Bayer, UKPN and BASF.

Staff
Alex Bigg has been the CEO of MHP since 2016. Paul Burstow, former health minister of the UK, was named to company's board of advisors in September 2015.

International offices
MHP has offices in London, Frankfurt, Hong Kong, Singapore, Sydney and New York.

References

External links 
 mhpc.com

Public relations companies of the United Kingdom
Companies based in the City of Westminster